The Yeomanry and Volunteers Act 1802 (42 Geo. III, c. 66) was an Act of the Parliament of the United Kingdom affecting the Yeomanry and Volunteers, two of the military Reserve Forces raised in the United Kingdom for home defence. Following the creation of the British Army Regular Reserve in 1859, by the then Secretary of State for War, Sidney Herbert, and re-organised under the Reserve Force Act 1867, were increasingly referred to instead as the Auxiliary Forces or the Local Forces to prevent confusion. It only covered units in England, Wales, and Scotland, with Irish units provided for by the Yeomanry (Ireland) Act 1802.

The various units of Yeomanry and Volunteers had been raised during the French Revolutionary Wars, but were only meant to serve during wartime. With the Treaty of Amiens in March 1802, the legal basis for maintaining these forces had disappeared. The Act allowed these corps to continue in service during peacetime on a voluntary basis.

The Act exempted members of these units from the militia ballot, in return for attending a minimum of five days exercise per year, and from various small taxes such as the duty on horses for men of the Yeomanry. When called into active service outside their county, they received standard Army pay but were subject to military regulations, and men disabled on active service were eligible for half-pay or Chelsea pensions.

References

United Kingdom Acts of Parliament 1802
19th-century military history of the United Kingdom
United Kingdom military law
Repealed United Kingdom Acts of Parliament
British defence policymaking